Mauro Jaqueson Júnior Ferreira dos Santos (born 6 May 1999), commonly known as Mauro Júnior, is a Brazilian professional footballer who plays as a midfielder or fullback for PSV Eindhoven.

Club career
On 23 June 2017, Mauro Júnior signed a five-year contract with PSV until 2022.

He was sent out on a season-long loan to fellow Eredivisie club Heracles Almelo for the 2019–20 season. On 20 September 2019, he scored a brace as Heracles defeated local rivals FC Twente by a score of 3–2.

On 24 September 2020, Mauro Júnior scored his side's second goal in a 5–1 away win over NŠ Mura in the third qualifying round of the UEFA Europa League.

On 2 July 2021, PSV extended Mauro Júnior's contract until the summer of 2025.

International career
Mauro Júnior represented Brazil at the 2015 South American Under-17 Football Championship. He came on as a substitute for Marco Túlio in the final, a 1–0 loss to Colombia.

Career statistics

Club

Honours
PSV
KNVB Cup: 2021–22
Johan Cruyff Shield: 2021

References

External links
 Profile at the PSV Eindhoven website
 

1999 births
Living people
Brazilian footballers
Brazil youth international footballers
Association football forwards
Desportivo Brasil players
PSV Eindhoven players
Heracles Almelo players
Eredivisie players
Eerste Divisie players
Jong PSV players
Brazilian expatriate footballers
Expatriate footballers in the Netherlands
Brazilian expatriate sportspeople in the Netherlands